William James Morley FRIBA (1847 – 16 March 1930) was an English architect who practised from offices in Bolton, Greater Manchester and Bradford, West Yorkshire.

Career

He was born in 1847 in Heaton, West Yorkshire, the son of George Morley (1816-1888) and Mary Duffield (1818-1871). He was educated at Leeds Grammar School. He married Annie Brook (1849-1910) on 10 April 1872 in Manningham, Yorkshire and they had eight children:
Sir George Morley CBE KPM (1873–1942)
Richard Morley (1876–1940)
William Harold Morley (b. 1877)
Agnes Brook Morley (189–1968)
Mary Isabel Morley (1880–1961)
Arthur Morley OBE KC (1882–1946)
Eric Morley (b. 1885)
Revd. Francis Douglas Morley (1888–1964)

He was articled to the architectural firm of Lockwood and Mawson from 1861 to 1868 and was then the manager of the firm until 1873. He entered into partnership with George Woodhouse in 1883, and after the death of George in the same year, he continued with his son. 

Later he entered into partnership with his son, Eric Morley (b. 1885) and practised as W.J. Morley and Son of Bradford.

He was appointed Fellow of the Royal Institute of British Architects on 21 November 1892.

His wife, Annie Morley, was killed in a road accident in Bradford in January 1910.

Notable works

References

1847 births
1930 deaths
Gothic Revival architects
British neoclassical architects
Architects from Bradford
Fellows of the Royal Institute of British Architects
People educated at Leeds Grammar School